trans-Diptoindonesin B is an oligomeric stilbenoid.

It is a resveratrol trimer. It can be isolated from Dryobalanops oblongifolia.

References 

Resveratrol oligomers